Olimpija may refer to:

 Olimpija Liepāja (1926–1940), a football club in Liepāja, Latvia
 Olimpija Ljubljana (disambiguation), several sports clubs in Ljubljana, Slovenia
 Olimpija Osijek, a football club in Osijek, Croatia
 Olimpija Rīga (1992–1995), a football club in Riga, Latvia